The Philips Intimate Massager is a range of electric personal massagers made by Philips which were first introduced to the UK market during 2008. When the line was launched, commentators questioned whether Philips' movement into the sex-toy market was a sign that sex-toys were gaining mainstream acceptance. After only two years, however, the line was discontinued due to "lack of demand".

See also 
 Hitachi Magic Wand

References

Sources and further reading 
 Philips Intimate Massager official site
 Philips changes the mood with Warm Intimate Massager
 Electronics giant Philips to launch sex toy range

Massage devices
Intimate massager